Ghiduleni is a commune in Rezina District, Moldova. It is composed of three villages: Ghiduleni, Roșcanii de Jos and Roșcanii de Sus.

References

Communes of Rezina District